MT-1, MT-01, MT1 or MT 1 may refer to:
 MT 1, Montana Highway 1
 MT-1,  Montana's 1st congressional district
 Yamaha MT-01, a motorcycle
 MT-1 airplane, see Manshū Hayabusa
 MT1 protein, see Melatonin receptor 1A